Hege Kirsti Frøseth (born 20 December 1969 in Trondheim) is a Norwegian retired team handball goalkeeper. She received a silver medal at the 1992 Summer Olympics in Barcelona with the Norwegian national team. She also played for the club Byåsen IL.

Frøseth is married to former footballer Stig Inge Bjørnebye, with whom she has three children.

References

External links

1969 births
Living people
Norwegian female handball players
Olympic silver medalists for Norway
Olympic handball players of Norway
Handball players at the 1992 Summer Olympics
Sportspeople from Trondheim
Olympic medalists in handball
Medalists at the 1992 Summer Olympics